The SMW Tag Team Championship was the tag team title in Smoky Mountain Wrestling . It existed from 1992 until 1995 when the promotion closed. This is a tag team championship in the sport of professional wrestling.

Title history

References

Smoky Mountain Wrestling championships
Tag team wrestling championships